Roger Biffi (Bellegarde, 30 December 1942 - Toulouse, 1 May 2004) was a rugby league  and rugby union player. He played as second row.

Career
Biffi first started his career playing rugby union for CA Lannemezan until 1968, when he switched codes to play rugby league for Saint-Gaudens, where he played until the end of his career, in 1973. He was also capped 7 times for France, taking part at the 1970 Rugby League World Cup.

Honours 
 Rugby league:
 French Championship:
 2 time Champion in: 1969, 1973 (Saint-Gaudens)
 3 times finalist in 1968, 1970, 1971 (Saint-Gaudens)

References

External links 
Roger Biffi at rugbyleagueproject.com

1942 births
2004 deaths
Sportspeople from Gers
CA Lannemezan players
France national rugby league team players
French rugby league players
Rugby league second-rows
Rugby union locks
Saint-Gaudens Bears players
French rugby union players